The Lesser Lule River is a tributary of the Lule River in north Norrland, in Norrbotten County, Sweden. The river, which is entirely within the municipality of Jokkmokk, is 238 km long, with a drainage basin of approximately 9800 km². The longest tributary of the Lesser Lule River is called Tarrajåkkå and it originates in the southern part of Sarek Fell. The river flows southeast, passing Lakes Saggat (302 amsl), Skalka (295 amsl) and Randi (284 amsl) before it reaches Jokkmokk. After Jokkmokk, it flows towards Vuollerim where it joins the Greater Lule River. The river's largest tributaries are the Rapa and Pärl Rivers. The waterflow of the Lesser Lule River is regulated.

Hydroelectrical plants along the Lesser Lule River 
The Lesser Lule River has several hydro-electric power stations on it. All of the station are owned by Vattenfall AB. These plants have cut off the traditional migratory routes followed by the Sámi in the area, causing some of the reindeer herders to have to truck the animals between the summer and winter camps.

Sources
 Vattenfall AB

References

Lule River basin
Rivers of Norrbotten County